Alopoglossus harrisi is a species of lizard in the family Alopoglossidae. It is found in Ecuador and Colombia.

References

A. harrisi was named in honor of Dennis Harris, for his outstanding contributions to the taxonomy of Alopoglossidae. Harris completed the only available review of the genus Ptychoglossus, and figures as an author in the descriptions of almost one third of the currently known alopoglossid species.

Alopoglossus
Reptiles described in 2020
Taxa named by Cristian Hernández Morales
Taxa named by Marcelo José Sturaro
Taxa named by Pedro M. Sales-Nunes
Taxa named by Sebastian Lotzkat
Taxa named by Pedro L.V. Peloso